Scottish actor Gerard Butler has been in numerous films and television series since his on-screen debut in 1997's Mrs. Brown. After taking minor roles in releases such as the James Bond film Tomorrow Never Dies (1997) and the horror film Tale of the Mummy (1998), he took the lead in 2000, portraying Dracula in Dracula 2000. Butler co-starred in the films Reign of Fire (2002), alongside Christian Bale, and Lara Croft: Tomb Raider – The Cradle of Life (2003), with Angelina Jolie, before playing André Marek in the adaptation of Michael Crichton's science fiction adventure Timeline (2003). Then he was cast as Erik, The Phantom in Joel Schumacher's 2004 film adaptation of the musical The Phantom of the Opera alongside Emmy Rossum, and Butterfly on a Wheel with Pierce Brosnan and Maria Bello.
Although these films were important breaks, it was only in 2007 that Butler gained worldwide recognition for his portrayal of King Leonidas in Zack Snyder's 2007 fantasy war film 300. It earning him a MTV Movie Award for Best Fight and an Empire Award for Best Actor nomination. That same year, Butler starred in the romantic drama film P.S. I Love You with Hilary Swank. After appearing in the 2008 films Nim's Island with Jodie Foster and RocknRolla with Idris Elba, Butler took the lead in several 2009 films including the romantic comedy The Ugly Truth with Katherine Heigl and the thriller Law Abiding Citizen with Jamie Foxx.

In 2010, Butler voiced the role of Stoick the Vast in the animated action-fantasy film How to Train Your Dragon, a role he later reprised in Legend of the Boneknapper Dragon (2010), Gift of the Night Fury (2011) and How to Train Your Dragon 2 (2014). He played military leader Tullus Aufidius in the 2011 film Coriolanus, the modernized adaptation of Shakespeare's tragedy of the same name. He also portrayed Sam Childers in the 2011 action biopic Machine Gun Preacher. In 2012, Butler co-starred in the biographical drama film Chasing Mavericks with Jonny Weston, and the romantic comedy film Playing for Keeps with Jessica Biel. He starred as Mike Banning in the action thriller film London Has Fallen opposite Morgan Freeman in 2016 and had a minor part in the 2014 film 300: Rise of an Empire where he reprised his role as King Leonidas in a flashback.

Butler made his television debut in 1998's The Young Person's Guide to Becoming a Rock Star (1998), portraying Marty Claymore. In the 2001 miniseries Attila, Butler took the title role, and the following year he was cast as Johnnie Donne in The Jury.

Film

Television

References

External links 
 

Male actor filmographies
British filmographies
Scottish filmographies
Featured lists